The 2005 Women's FA Community Shield was the sixth Women's FA Community Shield, as with its male equivalent, the Community Shield is an annual football match played between the winners of the previous season's league and the previous season's Women's FA Cup. Arsenal won 4-0.

References

Women's FA Community Shield
Community Shield
Community Shield
Community Shield
Community Shield